Karoline Mariechen "Karol" Meyer (born October 19, 1968 in Recife, Pernambuco) is a Brazilian free-diver. She is a Guinness Book of World Records record holder for apnea free diving, with a dive of 121 m (328 ft) and another static record with O2 for 18 minutes and 32 seconds.

Career
Meyer began diving during childhood. She became a competitive freediver in 1998. She has gone on to hold 8 world records, 2 Pan-American Records, 30 South American records, and 6 national records. She has also won several international competitions representing Brazil.

Meyer became the first and only Brazilian woman athlete to achieve world records, and the first athlete in the freediving world to break a world record during an official free diving competition, according to Rank Brasil.

During her career, Meyer collect 13 victories in international events and 7 victories in national events. She achieved one of the deepest shipwreck dives in the world at Fernando de Noronha, diving 63 meters to reach the Corveta Ipiranga.

In addition to competitions, Meyer is Yoga teacher and also freediving Instructor Trainer and Official Judge  AIDA, PADI and NAUI.

Homaged with 2 international awards as the Best Coach and Best Instrutor in the world,  by Icare Trophye and recently by SUUNTO/ AIDA - International Association to Apnea Development.

Meyer is also speaker at companies, as well as at boat and dive shows, and she is also a columnist/writer for several magazines.

In 2016 was selected to participate in the women's cycling team of Avai, being currently the 6th best cycling athlete by the National Ranking of the Brazilian Cycling Confederation, Elite category.

Charity work
Besides freediving, Meyer contributes toward fundraising for needy communities, public schools. She supports programmes against child labour, and advocated for children who live in front of the sea and have parents whose income depends directly on the sea.

Meyer works with the Brazilian Islands Society and other entities to protect whales, especially Franca whales. She also contributes to the Franca Whale Project, the Tamar Project,  Gouliath Groupers Brazilian Preservation and SeaShepherd as Sea Ambassador.

Records
The following are some of Meyer's records:

World
Skandalopetra (CMAS): 68,9m, Bonaire 2012
Static Apnea with pure oxygen (Guinness): 18 minutes, 32 seconds
No Limits Tandem: 121m
Skandalopetra (CMAS): 61,5m
Female No Limits Tandem: 91m
Static Apnea: 5'49"
Static Apnea: 6'02 (first record done in competition)
Static Apnea: 6'13"

Continental
Static Apnea: 7'18"

South American
Variable Ballast: 93m
Dynamic Apnea without fins: 113m (pb)

National
Absolute Record and best South American No Limits: 100m
Absolute Record and South American Free Immersion: 68m
Dynamic Apnea with fins: 153m (pb)
Constant Weight: 71m (pb regional)

Awards
Meyer has been an international top 10 athlete as voted by the AIDA for the past 15 years.http://www.aidainternational.org/competitive/ranking
She was honored by Caixa as one of the "Women who transform the world". 
GoOutside Magazine elected her as Best Adventurer in 2006 and 2010. 
Icare Trophie awarded Meyer “Best Female Freediver" in 2007 and "Best Coach" in 2006.

Other awards earned by Meyer include the following:

 Guinness Book Record Holder 2011
 Medal Julio De Lamare 2008 - Brazilian Aquatic Federation
 International Trophie - "World's Absolute Freediver Awards"
 International Trophie - "Special ICARE" pela completa carreira no esporte
 Award Personality of the Year 2000/2001 - Mergulho Magazine
 Rank Brasil trophie

References

Brazilian freedivers
Living people
1968 births